Jeffrey Obrow is an American film director and a professor at USC School of Cinematic Arts. He has also produced many music videos with Propaganda Films.

Career

Obrow's first project, The Dorm That Dripped Blood, was underfinanced but through that low budget a new type of horror movie trope emerged by accident (flashlit basements).

Filmography
 The Dorm That Dripped Blood (1982)
 The Power (1984)
 The Kindred (1987)
 Servants of Twilight (1991)
 Bram Stoker's Legend of the Mummy (1997)
 They Are Among Us (2004)

References

External links
 Official website

American film directors
Living people
Horror film directors
Year of birth missing (living people)
Place of birth missing (living people)
UCLA Film School alumni
USC School of Cinematic Arts faculty